Keyennu Lont (born 4 April 2000) is a Dutch professional footballer who plays as a winger.

Career

Early years
Lont started his youth career with VV De Zouaven before moving to the academy of AZ. He was included in the reserve team Jong AZ in 2019, where he made his professional debut in the Eerste Divisie on 13 September 2019. This was in the 2–3 away loss against Jong PSV, in which he came on as a substitute for Thijs Oosting in the 87th minute.

In January 2020, Lont signed a contract until the end of the season with ADO Den Haag, where he played three games for the reserve team Jong ADO Den Haag in the Derde Divisie. In July 2020, Lont signed on a free transfer for Feyenoord where he was included in the reserve team, Feyenoord U21.

Helmond Sport
On 25 May 2021, Lont went on trial with Helmond Sport which proved successful. He signed a one-year contract with an option for an additional year on 30 July 2021. On 6 August, the opening day of the 2021–22 Eerste Divisie season, Lont made his debut for Helmond Sport, coming on as a substitute for Jules Houttequiet in a 0–2 loss against FC Den Bosch at De Vliert. He suffered a toe injury into the season, which kept him sidelined for months. On 31 March 2022, the club announced that it would not extend the contracts of a number of players, including Lont, effectively making him a free agent from 1 July.

Personal life
In 2021, Lont started dating Dutch television presenter Veronica van Hoogdalem.

Career statistics

References

External links

2000 births
Living people
People from Stede Broec
Footballers from North Holland
Dutch footballers
Association football wingers
AZ Alkmaar players
Jong AZ players
ADO Den Haag players
Feyenoord players
Helmond Sport players
Eerste Divisie players
Derde Divisie players
VV De Zouaven players